Qaafiyaa or Qafiyah is a device employed in a form of Persian poetry and Urdu poetry known as ghazal (a poetic form consisting of couplets which share a rhyme and a refrain) and also in nazm. The  is the rhyming pattern of words that must directly precede the ghazal's radif.

Origin
Ghazal is a form of romantic Arabic poetry. Ghazal is essentially flirtatious and quite often playful poetry. 

A ghazal which has no  is known as ghair muradaf ghazal; if it contains radif, it is called a muradaf ghazal.

References

Urdu-language poetry
Ghazal
Rhyme